Ruth Gowdy McKinley  (1931 – December 8, 1981) was an American-born Canadian ceramic artist noted for her skill in designing functional ceramic ware. She specialized in making teapots, cups and vases.

Early life 
Born in Brooklyn, New York, McKinley originally studied classical piano from the age of four and was eventually offered admission to study at the Juilliard School of Music in New York City. McKinley then made the decision to work with pottery  by enrolling, instead, to study in the Department of Industrial Design at the New York State College of Ceramics in Alfred. McKinley earned her MFA from Alfred University in 1955. She came to Canada in 1967.

Career
In 1967, she became the resident Potter at Sheridan College of Art and Design in Missisauga, Ontario. In 1973, she made her exhibition debut at the Ceramics International 1973 at the University of Calgary and won the Metal award. In 1976, she became the first potter elected into the Royal Canadian Academy of Art. In 1997, her retrospective was held at the Burlington Art Centre. Her work is included in the collections of the Musée national des beaux-arts du Québec, the Art Gallery of Burlington, the Canadian Clay and Glass Gallery, the Gardiner Museum, Toronto; and the Canadian Museum of Civilization, Gatineau, Quebec.

The Ruth Gowdy McKinley project records are in Archives Ontario.

Legacy
In 1993, in honour of Ruth Gowdy McKinley, the Canadian Clay and Glass Gallery opened in Waterloo, Ontario largely due to the efforts of Gowdy McKinley’s friends and colleagues who wished to honour her memory.

References 

1931 births
1981 deaths
Canadian ceramists
Canadian women ceramists
20th-century ceramists
New York State College of Ceramics alumni
American emigrants to Canada
Members of the Royal Canadian Academy of Arts